Meshach A. "Mesh" Tenney (November 16, 1907 – November 6, 1993) was an American Thoroughbred horse trainer.

From Arizona, Tenney began his career as a Thoroughbred trainer in the western United States in 1935. He won the Santa Anita Derby three times (1955, 1956, 1963) and was the leading money-winning trainer in the United States in 1962 and 1963.

Tenney is best remembered as the trainer of  Swaps, who won the 1955 Kentucky Derby and the Eclipse Award for Horse of the Year in 1956. He also trained Candy Spots, who won the 1963 Preakness Stakes and finished 2nd in both the Derby and the Belmont Stakes.

During his 40-year career, Tenney trained 36 stakes winners. In 1991, he was inducted into the National Museum of Racing and Hall of Fame.

Tenney died in Safford, Arizona, in 1993.

References
 Mesh Tenney at the National Museum of Racing and Hall of Fame

American horse trainers
United States Thoroughbred Racing Hall of Fame inductees
1907 births
1993 deaths
American Latter Day Saints
Sportspeople from Arizona